This is a list of Water Skiing European Champions Under-17.

See also

 Water skiing
 Masters Tournament (water ski)
 World water skiing champions
 List of Water Skiing European Champions
 List of Water Skiing Under-21 European Champions

References

External links
International Waterski and Wakeboard Federation
E&A LIST OF CHAMPIONS - U17 Championships

Water Ski European Championships